This article comprises three sortable tables of major mountain peaks of the U.S. State of Wyoming.

The summit of a mountain or hill may be measured in three principal ways:
The topographic elevation of a summit measures the height of the summit above a geodetic sea level.  The first table below ranks the 40 highest major summits of Wyoming by elevation.
The topographic prominence of a summit is a measure of how high the summit rises above its surroundings.  The second table below ranks the 40 most prominent summits of Wyoming.
The topographic isolation (or radius of dominance) of a summit measures how far the summit lies from its nearest point of equal elevation.  The third table below ranks the 40 most isolated major summits of Wyoming.


Highest major summits

Of the highest major summits of Wyoming, five peaks exceed  elevation, 16 peaks exceed , and 38 peaks exceed  elevation.

Most prominent summits

Of the most prominent summits of Wyoming, Cloud Peak and Gannett Peak both exceed  of topographic prominence. Nine peaks exceed  of topographic prominence.

Most isolated major summits

Of the most isolated major summits of Wyoming, four peaks exceed  of topographic isolation and 32 peaks exceed  of topographic isolation.

Hazards

Encountering bears is a concern in the Wind River Range. There are other concerns as well, including bugs, wildfires, adverse snow conditions and nighttime cold temperatures.

Importantly, there have been notable incidents, including accidental deaths, due to falls from steep cliffs (a misstep could be fatal in this class 4/5 terrain) and due to falling rocks, over the years, including 1993, 2007 (involving an experienced NOLS leader), 2015 and 2018. Other incidents include a seriously injured backpacker being airlifted near SquareTop Mountain in 2005, and a fatal hiker incident (from an apparent accidental fall) in 2006 that involved state search and rescue. The U.S. Forest Service does not offer updated aggregated records on the official number of fatalities in the Wind River Range.

Gallery

See also

List of mountain peaks of North America
List of mountain peaks of Greenland
List of mountain peaks of Canada
List of mountain peaks of the Rocky Mountains
List of mountain peaks of the United States
List of mountain peaks of Alaska
List of mountain peaks of Arizona
List of mountain peaks of California
List of mountain peaks of Colorado
List of mountain peaks of Hawaii
List of mountain peaks of Idaho
List of mountain peaks of Montana
List of mountain peaks of Nevada
List of mountain peaks of New Mexico
List of mountain peaks of Oregon
List of mountain peaks of Utah
List of mountain peaks of Washington (state)

List of mountains of Wyoming
List of mountain peaks of México
List of mountain peaks of Central America
List of mountain peaks of the Caribbean
Wyoming
Geography of Wyoming
:Category:Mountains of Wyoming
commons:Category:Mountains of Wyoming
Physical geography
Topography
Topographic elevation
Topographic prominence
Topographic isolation

Notes

References

External links

United States Geological Survey (USGS)
Geographic Names Information System @ USGS
United States National Geodetic Survey (NGS)
Geodetic Glossary @ NGS
NGVD 29 to NAVD 88 online elevation converter @ NGS
Survey Marks and Datasheets @ NGS
Bivouac.com
Peakbagger.com
Peaklist.org
Peakware.com
Summitpost.org

 

Lists of landforms of Wyoming
Wyoming, List Of Mountain Peaks Of
Wyoming, List Of Mountain Peaks Of
Wyoming, List Of Mountain Peaks Of
Wyoming, List Of Mountain Peaks Of
Wyoming, List Of Mountain Peaks Of